{{DISPLAYTITLE:C9H11NO2}}
The molecular formula C9H11NO2 (molar mass: 165.18 g/mol, exact mass: 165.078979) may refer to:

 Benzocaine
 Ethenzamide
 Methylenedioxyphenethylamine
 Metolcarb
 Norsalsolinol
 3,4-Methylenedioxy-N-methylbenzylamine, closely related to isosafrole.
 Phenylalanine

References